Manuel López-Quiroga Miquel (January 30, 1899 – December 13, 1988), better known as Maestro Quiroga, was a Spanish composer especially known for his coplas, cuplés, and zarzuelas. He was also a pianist and one of the group of songwriters, Quintero, León and Quiroga, who created some of Spain's most popular and best-known songs from the mid-twentieth century.

Biography

Maestro Quiroga was born in Seville, Spain. In 1934 he began dedicating himself completely to  music, giving classes to other new artists and composing. He was a prolific composer, with more than 5,000 works to his name, many of them becoming very popular in the 1940s and 1950s in Spain. As he did not write words, he always surrounded himself with lyricists like Salvador Valverde, Antonio Quintero and Rafael de León. Some of his most popular songs are Tatuaje, Rocio, La Paralla, María de la O, Ojos verdes, Te Lo Juro Yo and La Zarzamora.

He also composed several works for the stage. In 1941, he wrote La reina fea for the zarzuela star soprano, Pepita Embil. Her son, renowned tenor Plácido Domingo, has since recorded several of Quiroga's songs.

Maestro Quiroga died from a pulmonary edema at Virgen del Mar de Madrid clinic on December 13, 1988.

Compositions

Works for orchestra
 Ojos Verdes     
 Rosa de Capuchinos 
 Romance de la Otra  
 Te he de Querer nientras Viva

Works for band
 1935 María de la O, canción-zambra – Text: Salvador Valverde en Rafael de León
 1946 Suite Andaluza
 Noche en Granada
 Mezquita (baile)
 Bolero flamenco
 1947 Brisas de Andalucía, suite
 Garrotín de Córdoba
 Andalucía Mora (Baile)
 Maleficio (Danza)
 1950 Virgen de la Palma, marcha procesional
 1954 Color Moreno, espectacolo de danza y copla
 1956 Jaime Ostos, paso-doble 
 1960 Españolerías, paso-doble
 1980 Una saeta a la Virgen, marcha procesional
 ¡Ay, Maricruz! canción paso-doble – Rafael de León en Salvador Valverde
 Candelaria, marcha procesional
 Capote de grana y. oro, paso-doble  – Text: Rafael de León en Antonio Quintero Ranmírez
 Carmen de España, paso-doble – Text: Antonio Quintero Ranmírez en Rafael de León
 Celos zambra – Text: Antonio Quintero Ranmírez en Rafael de León
 Cocidito madrileño, paso-doble – Text:  Rafael de León en Antonio Quintero Ranmírez
 Coplas de Luis Candelas, canción paso-doble – Text: Rafael de León
 Francisco Alegre, paso-doble torero – Text: Rafael de León en Antonio Quintero Ranmírez
 La parrala, canción paso-doble – Text: Rafael de León en Arias Saavedra
 La zarzamora marcha-canción – Text: Antonio Quintero Ranmírez en Rafael de León
 Lola puñales, marcha – Text: Antonio Quintero Ranmírez en Rafael de León
 Prisionera de los celos, marcha – Text: Antonio Quintero Ranmírez en  Rafael de León
 Suite Gitana 
 Interludio 
 Danza del Velorio 
 Bolero

Stage works
 La Marquesa chulapa
 Pan y quesillo
 Sevilla, que grande eres

Zarzuelas
 1918 El Presagio rojo, 1 act – libretto: Fernando Márquez y Tirado and Salvador Videgaín García
 1921 La Niña de los perros
 1923 El Cortijo de "Las Matas", 1 act – libretto: Fernando Marquez y Tirado
 1927 De buena cepa – libretto: Francisco Acebal
 1935 María de la O
 1941 La Reina fea, 1 act – libretto: Fernando Márquez y Tirado and Pedro Llabrés Rubio
 1944 Pepita Romero – libretto: Federico Romero and Guillermo Fernández-Shaw
 1947 Gloria La Petenera

Vocal music
 1962 Contigo nada más, cha-cha-chá – Text: Carlos Salto
 1963 Don Nicanor, polka-fox (together with: Ramón Cobián) – Text: A. Gîaï Padilla
 1963 Chupirindango, bossa-nova ritual (together with: Ramón Cobián) – Text: A. Gîaï Padilla 
 ¡Ay, macarena!, canción – Text: Rafael de León en Antonio Quintero Ranmírez
 ¡Ay, pena, penita! farruca – Text: Rafael de León en Antonio Quintero Ranmírez
 A la Lima y al Limón
 Aserrín, aserrín, villancicos – Text: Rafael de León en Arias Saavedra
 Ay, Mari Cruz
 Carcelero, carcelero, canción flamenca – Text: Rafael de León en Antonio Quintero Ranmírez
 Doña Sol
 La niña de la estación
 No me llames Dolores O, canción – Text: Rafael de León
 Ojos verdes
 Tatuaje, canción del puerto – Text: Rafael de León, Arias Saavedra en Alejandro Rodríguez Gómez
 Y sin embargo te quiero

Sources
 Maria de los Angeles Pidal Fernandez. El compositor Manuel López-Quiroga.
 Miguel Espín en Romualdo Molina. Quiroga. Un genio sevillano.  Fundación Autor, 1999. 

Spanish composers
Spanish male composers
Spanish pianists
Spanish violinists
Male violinists
People from Seville
1899 births
1988 deaths
Deaths from pulmonary edema
20th-century composers
20th-century pianists
20th-century violinists
20th-century Spanish musicians
Male pianists
20th-century Spanish male musicians